Thaumatoperla alpina is a species of stonefly in the genus Thaumatoperla, and are the largest Australian stonefly. They are endemic to the Bogong High Plains area of the Victorian alps, Australia.

Description
Large insect, females 36-44 mm (excluding antennae and cerci), males generally smaller.

As adult: Two pairs of wide, black membranous wings, the posterior wings having a dark-blue iridescence. Head and legs black. The prothorax is large, oval-shaped and orange and with a distinct black marking in the centre of the pronotum. The cylindrical abdomen is slightly flattened dorsally and pale yellowish-grey with black markings. Two large black cerci and two long black antennae.

They are incapable of flight.

Distribution
Thaumatoperla alpina are endemic to the Bogong High Plains of the Victorian alpine area in south-eastern Australia. Genetic analyses indicate that there are three sub-populations separated by the three main catchments: West Kiewa, East Kiewa and Mitta Mitta.

Habitat
T. alpina inhabit alpine riparian heathland. Nymphs live in the hyporheic zone of mountain streams. Where introduced rainbow trout (Oncorhynchus mykiss) are absent, T. alpina nymphs are the top-level stream predators.

Life history
T. alpina spend approximately three years as nymphs. They emerge as adults in January - April.

Etymology
From Latin Alpinus, referring to their alpine habitat.

Conservation Status
Listed as Threatened under the EPBC Act 1999 and Flora and Fauna Guarantee Act 1988.

References

Aquatic insects
Plecoptera